Count Me In is the third studio album by Boston hardcore punk band Death Before Dishonor. It was released in 2007 on Bridge 9 Records. The artwork for the album was designed by Converge vocalist Jacob Bannon.

Track list

References

2007 albums
Death Before Dishonor (band) albums
Bridge 9 Records albums
Albums with cover art by Jacob Bannon